The Glasgow University Conservative Association was originally called the 'Peel Club' after Sir Robert Peel was elected Rector of Glasgow University in 1836, but by 1898 is referred to in documents as the 'Glasgow University Conservative Club', before being re-formed as the Conservative Association in the early 2000s. Apart from name changes, it is the same organisation, therefore all past presidents known appear on this list.

The presidents

The table below shows all known past presidents of Glasgow University.
Most data here has been retrieved from documents deposited in the Glasgow University Archives.

References 

Clubs and societies of the University of Glasgow